Przemysl is a Polish masculine given name. Other variants are Przemysław and in Czech, Přemysl. Nicknames and diminutive forms include Přemek or Przemek, Premek, Přemo or Przemo, Přemyslek, Przemko.

Famous bearers

Polish monarchs 
 Przemysł I of Greater Poland – Duke of Greater Poland
 Przemysł II – Grand Duke and King of Poland, son of Przemysł I
 Przemysł of Inowrocław – regional Duke in Poland

See also
 Przemysław

References 
Přemysl at Behind The Name, also Przemysław with the addition of the Slavic element slava (glory, fame)
Lidovky.cz (Czech)

Polish masculine given names
Slavic masculine given names